The Qatar–Saudi Arabia border is 87 km (54 mi) in length and runs from the Gulf of Bahrain coast in the west to the Persian Gulf coast in the east.

Description 
The border begins in the west at the Gulf of Salwah, proceeding overland via 4-5 straight lines (maps differ on the precise depiction) which forms a broad arc, terminating in the east at the Khawr al Udayd coast.

Qatar–United Arab Emirates border

Prior to the signing of the 1974 Treaty of Jeddah between Saudi Arabia and the UAE there was some confusion as to whether Qatar shared a border with the UAE, with maps commonly depicting a long Emirati panhandle touching Qatar. This Treaty gave Saudi Arabia access to the Khawr al Udayd, thereby removing any the possibility of Qatar sharing a border with the UAE.

History
Historically there was no clearly defined boundary in this part of the Arabian peninsula. From 1868 Britain exercised control over Qatar as a de facto protectorate, formalised as such in 1916. The interior of Arabia consisted of loosely organised Arab groupings, occasionally forming emirates, most prominent of which was the Emirate of Nejd and Hasa ruled by the al-Saud family. Britain and the Ottoman Empire theoretically divided their realms of influence via the so-called 'Blue' and 'Violet lines' in 1913–14.

During the First World War an Arab Revolt, supported by Britain, succeeded in removing the Ottomans from much of the Middle East; in the period following this Ibn Saud managed to expand his kingdom considerably, eventually proclaiming the Kingdom of Saudi Arabia in 1932. Ibn Saud refused to recognise the Anglo-Ottoman lines and lay claim to large parts of the eastern Arabian hinterland (the so-called ‘Hamza line’).

On 25 November 1935 British officials met with Ibn Saud in an attempt to finalise a frontier between the new kingdom and their coastal protectorates, including Qatar. The conference proved abortive however and the issue remained unresolved. According to a British document written in 1936, the prime cause of friction in the territorial dispute revolved around where Qatar's south-west borders should end. The rulers of both Qatar and Saudi Arabia claimed that their control of the Dohat Salwa area had historical precedent, however, Ibn Saud claimed that the Sheikh of Qatar had previously ceded to him this territory, to which the Sheikh vehemently denied. The letter stated:

The conference proved abortive however and the issue remained unresolved. In 1955, following an attempt by Saudi Arabia to assert its control over the Buraimi Oasis on the Oman-Trucial States border, Britain stated that it would unilaterally use a slightly modified version of the 1935 'Riyadh line' henceforth.

A border treaty between Qatar and Saudi Arabia was made in 1965, though the precise terms of its implementation was a long-standing point of contention between the two. In September 1992, tensions arose between the two when Saudi forces allegedly attacked a Qatari border post, resulting in the death of two Qatari soldiers and the imprisonment of a third. A border agreement was reached between the two parties in 1999 and the final treaty was signed in 2001.

Following a severe deterioration in Saudi-Qatar relations in 2017 the border was shut. In June 2018 Saudi Arabia announced that it is planning on constructing a 61 km (38 mi) long Salwa Canal running along the Saudi side of the Salwa Border Crossing at a cost of $745 million. The canal is set to physically separate Qatar from its only land border and effectually render it an island. Media outlets in Saudi Arabia hinted at the possibility of the Saudi government dedicating portions of the canal towards a military installation and a dump site for nuclear waste. The border was reopened on 4 January 2021, in November 2021, the border was re-demarcated, with Qatar gaining the southern shore of the Khawr al Udayd.

Border Crossings
 Abu Samra

See also
 Qatar-Saudi Arabia relations

References

 
Borders of Qatar
Borders of Saudi Arabia
International borders